Shirokë (definite Albanian, Shiroka) may refer to:
Shirokë, Shkodër, previously settlement and now a neighbourhood of the urban agglomeration of Shkodër, Albania
Shirokë, Prizren, settlement in Suha Reka, Kosovo